"The Comedian" is the first episode of the 2019 version of the anthology television series The Twilight Zone. It was released on April 1, 2019, on CBS All Access. The episode was also posted on YouTube available in full length without signup or payment.

Opening narration

Plot
Struggling comedian Samir Wassan meets legendary comic J.C. Wheeler, who advises him to include personal material in his routines. After doing a successful routine centered around his dog, Samir returns home and discovers that not only did his dog vanish, but no one seems to remember that his dog ever existed.

He then learns that jokes about the people in his life get laughs, but cause them to disappear from existence. After accidentally erasing his nephew, Devin, Samir starts erasing people he thinks the world would be better off without. His girlfriend Rena leaves him after the erasing of her teacher David Kendall causes her to go from a successful lawyer to a struggling waitress. After another encounter with Wheeler, Samir continues abusing his power, going so far as erasing rival comic Didi Scott.

After Samir has another encounter with Wheeler, Rena confronts him during a set with a journal containing names of those he's erased. Realizing what he has done, Samir erases himself from existence.

Everyone previously erased exists again. Didi, now a rising star, meets Wheeler following a set and asks for his advice. The final shot shows Samir on the club's audience member mural.

Closing narration

Cast
 Kumail Nanjiani as Samir Wassan
 Amara Karan as Rena
 Diarra Kilpatrick as Didi Scott
 Ryan Robbins as David Kendall
 Tracy Morgan as J.C. Wheeler

Keith Phipps of Vulture describes J.C. as "a fantasy version of Dave Chappelle" who has "a relaxed demeanor".

Background
The inspiration for this episode was "Take My Life...Please!" from the 1985 series. Rosie Knight of The Hollywood Reporter stated, "Samir's story appears to take a large influence from [...] Death Note."

Reception
Jim Vorel of Paste Magazine wrote that the episode took too long, citing issues with the 60-minute timeslot in the original series, and that the material used for the jokes which the characters laugh about in-universe is not funny out of universe.

Keith Phipps of Vulture.com gave the episode two of five stars and also cited the length as being too long, stating that "the pace drags, the premise gets needlessly complicated, and by the time the climax rolls around the ending seems kind of obvious". Phipps however reacted positively to the "topical references" and the episode being "true to the spirit of the original show without feeling confined by it".

References

External links
 "The Comedian" on CBS All Access
 

The Twilight Zone episodes
2019 American television episodes